Sjraar Cuijpers (24 May 1902 – 12 June 1980) was a Dutch architect. His work was part of the architecture event in the art competition at the 1936 Summer Olympics.

References

1902 births
1980 deaths
20th-century Dutch architects
Olympic competitors in art competitions
People from Venlo